Chrysolampus is a genus of chalcid wasps.

Species 
 Chrysolampus aeneicornis Ratzeburg, 1852
 Chrysolampus aeneicorpus (Girault, 1915)
 Chrysolampus anguliventris Nees 1834
 Chrysolampus attenuatus Förster, 1841
 Chrysolampus brevicornis Förster, 1841
 Chrysolampus clypeatus Riek, 1966
 Chrysolampus coeruleovirens Förster, 1841
 Chrysolampus dentatus (Boucek, 1956)
 Chrysolampus dubius Förster, 1841
 Chrysolampus elegans Darling, 1986
 Chrysolampus ellipticus Förster, 1841
 Chrysolampus excellens Förster, 1841
 Chrysolampus fuscimanus Förster, 1841
 Chrysolampus gibbosus Förster, 1841
 Chrysolampus gilvipes Förster, 1841
 Chrysolampus granulatus Förster, 1841
 Chrysolampus hirtus Riek, 1966
 Chrysolampus improcerus Darling, 1986
 Chrysolampus indubitatus Förster, 1841
 Chrysolampus interruptus Förster, 1841
 Chrysolampus laevipetiolatus Förster, 1841
 Chrysolampus longigaster Riek, 1966
 Chrysolampus luridus Darling, 1986
 Chrysolampus niger Hedqvist, 1968
 Chrysolampus oblongiscutellum (Girault, 1922)
 Chrysolampus pachymerus Förster, 1841
 Chrysolampus pallitarsis Förster, 1841
 Chrysolampus picturatus Riek, 1966
 Chrysolampus prominens (Ruschka, 1924)
 Chrysolampus punctatus (Förster, 1859)
 Chrysolampus rufitarsis (Förster, 1859)
 Chrysolampus scapularis Ratzeburg, 1852
 Chrysolampus schwarzi Crawford, 1914
 Chrysolampus silvensis (Girault, 1929)
 Chrysolampus sisymbrii (Ashmead, 1896)
 Chrysolampus splendidulus (Spinola, 1808)
 Chrysolampus subcarinatus Förster, 1841
 Chrysolampus subsessilis Nees, 1834
 Chrysolampus tenuiscapus Förster, 1841
 Chrysolampus thenae (Walker 1848)
 Chrysolampus transversus Förster, 1841
 Chrysolampus verae (Nikol'skaya, 1954)

References

External links 

 

Hymenoptera genera
Chalcidoidea